The wire-crested thorntail (Discosura popelairii) is a hummingbird in the "coquettes", tribe Lesbiini of subfamily Lesbiinae. It is found in Colombia, Ecuador, Peru, and possibly Bolivia.

Taxonomy and systematics

The wire-crested thorntail and three other species were at one time placed in genus Popelairia but since the late 1900s that genus has been merged into the present Discosura. Some authors have further merged Discosura into Lophornis but this treatment has not been widely accepted. The species is monotypic.

Description

Adults of both sexes have coppery green upperparts with a white band across the rump. Males have a glittering green crown with a thin hair-like crest. Its gorget is iridescent green, the flanks brownish with a white patch, and the rest of the underparts black. The tail is steely blue with white feather shafts, deeply forked, and the outer feathers are very narrow which with the crest give the species its common name. The female does not have the crest. It has a broad white streak on the cheek. Its underparts are black with a white patch on the flank. Its tail is short, only slightly forked, and bluish black with white tips. Juveniles are similar to the adult female.

Distribution and habitat

The wire-crested thorntail is found in the Andean foothills from eastern Colombia's Meta Department through eastern Ecuador into eastern Peru as far south as the Department of Puno. In addition, there is at least one sight record in Bolivia.

Behavior

Movement

The wire-crested thorntail is believed to be sedentary.

Feeding

The wire-crested thorntail feeds on nectar, primarily in the forest canopy, and favoring the flowers of Inga trees. It also eats small arthropods.

Breeding

Almost nothing is known about the wire-crested thorntail's breeding phenology.

Vocalization

The only wire-crested thorntail vocalization that has been described is a "quiet, somewhat liquid 'tew'."

Status

The IUCN  assesses the wire-crested thorntail as being of Least Concern. Its population size and trend are not known. Its habitat is "under severe threat of destruction."

References

wire-crested thorntail
Birds of the Colombian Amazon
Birds of the Ecuadorian Amazon
Birds of the Peruvian Amazon
wire-crested thorntail
wire-crested thorntail